The Corner that Held Them is a novel by English writer Sylvia Townsend Warner, first published in 1948. It details the life of and lives inside a convent, from its establishment in the 12th century through to 1382. The plot involves the Black Death and multiple narratives that do not combine into a plot. The novel was originally published by Chatto & Windus with the American edition being published by Viking Press. It is Warner's favorite novel that she wrote. The novel explores if a community run by women is able to exist under patriarchy through portrayals of poverty, chastity, and obedience. Warner typed 58 pages for an unfinished sequel that was spread between four gatherings. The novel was reviewed favourably by Rachel Mann and Hermione Hoby.

Summary
The novel covers the events occurring inside the convent of Oby, including the impact of Black Death in 1349, the admission of a fake priest into the ranks and the ambitions of successive prioresses. Various characters commit fraud, corruption, murder, adultery and blasphemy. According to an article by The New York Times, "Characters ebb and flow from the foreground in a curiously swift historical rhythm, often killed off as soon as their stories have begun."

The nunnery was started by Brian de Retteville in memory of his dead wife Alianor. De Retteville murdered Alianor's lover, with her later dying after having children. De Retteville places their two daughters in the newly opened nunnery. The nuns drink beer, deal with small issues, witness murder, and discuss the next prioress elections. A nun is only able to move to a different office when the current holder of a position dies. The novel includes the nuns rarely showing kindness while also being ignorant. The perspective shifts among multiple characters with them worrying about issues such as rent and thieves. In one part of the novel, Henry Yellowlees spends a night at a leprosy hospital due to an errand given by the nuns and he listens to Ars nova played by the hospital's chaplain. In another part, the priest Sir Ralph searches for a hawk to show his gentility and later has the Dame of Brocton read the epic Lay of Mamillion to him. The multiple narratives do not combine into a plot.

Publication
Warner worked on the novel from 1942 to 1947. The British edition was published by Chatto & Windus and the American edition was published by Viking Press, both in 1948. Warner appended a historical note to the Viking Press American edition which failed to appear in British editions. The novel was republished in 2019 by New York Review Books Classics with an introduction by Claire Harman. Warner said that the novel has no plot and that it is her favourite novel of those she wrote. Despite Warner not considering it to be a "historical novel" due to it not having a thesis, some critics have thought of the novel as historical and allegorical. The dates in the novel were written to parody medieval historiography with subversion involving characters who are not aware of how events are affecting society, such as a nun who "had enjoyed the Black Death". Warner typed 58 pages for an unfinished sequel that was spread between four gatherings. The Journal of the Sylvia Townsend Warner Society by University College London published the unfinished sequel in two parts. The novel explores if a community ran by women is able to exist under patriarchy through portrayals of poverty, chastity, and obedience. Professor of Modern Literature Adam Piette surmised that Warner chose the Black Death as the novel's topic due to the quote "Look out for parachutists" by spokesmen during the Fall of France. The Black Death was said by Piette to be an analogy for Nazi ideology and invisibility that is caused by government propaganda in order to help boost morale.

Reception
Josephine Livingstone of The New York Times wrote that "Warner’s style is delicate and arch", while also comparing the style to the authors Barbara Pym and Evelyn Waugh. Rachel Mann, writing for Church Times said that the novel has a plot, but that Warner's "point holds truth" due to "the way Townsend Warner’s real interest is in how the nuns of Oby are caught up in their own obsessions while the world moves on without them." Hermione Hoby wrote in Harper's Magazine, "the book has no ending; it just ends. An equally conclusive ending could be found by closing your eyes, riffling back any number of pages, and designating a spot with your finger. Just as death so often does, the end comes abruptly, without fanfare." Commonweal said that "Warner breathes a world into being through witty prose and vivid imagination". It has been described by Philip Hensher as 'one of the most remarkable examples of a novelist rethinking what she can do with the novel as a form'.

Kirkus Reviews said in 1948 that the novel "is an effective re-creation of a phase of medieval England", but that it lacks in the "deep emotional quality" compared to works by Peter Abelard and Sigrid Undset's Kristin Lavransdatter trilogy.

References 

1948 British novels
Chatto & Windus books
Convents
Novels about religion
Novels about diseases and disorders